Orange City School District is a school district headquartered in Pepper Pike, Ohio.

Schools
 Orange Inclusive Preschool
 Early Childhood Preschool
 Moreland Hills School (K–5)
 Brady Middle School (6–8)
 Orange High School (9–12)

References

External links
 

School districts in Cuyahoga County, Ohio
School districts established in 1924
1924 establishments in Ohio